Dayal Pur is a census town in North East Delhi. It was named after a Gurjar zamindar Ch. Dayal Singh aka "Baba Dayala". Currently majority of native inhabitants range from 6th to 10th generation after Baba Dayala.
It was an agricultural village until last three decades when there was an influx of people from Garhwal, Kumaon and 'Purab'.

Demographics
 India census, Dayal Pur had a population of 20,589, compared to the 2001 census, when it was 12,994 The 2011 population comprised 11,024 males and 9,565 females, a sex ratio of 860, which equals the state average. There were 2,684 children 0–6 (13.4%) and the average literacy rate was 89.48%, higher than the state average of 86.21%.

Nearby places
Dayal Pur is near to 
Delhi University = 7 km  
ISBT = 10 km  
Anand Vihar = 12.5 km  
Old Delhi Railway Station = 12 km  
New Delhi Railway Station = 15 km  
Rajiv Chowk (CP) = 22 km  
Gokalpuri Metro Station = 3.7 km

Schools in the area 
Dayal Pur has one Govt school for boys and another for girls and primary school also.  
Few other private schools are also there.  
Chickz Wee Play School & Daycare facility

Local banks/ATMs
SBI ATM 
ICICI Bank ATM 
HDFC ATM

INDUSLAND BANK ATM

References

Cities and towns in North East Delhi district
Neighbourhoods in Delhi